Derwin Abrahams (1903–1974) was an American film director.  He directed four serials in the 1940s for Columbia Pictures, including Hop Harrigan, Chick Carter, Detective, Tex Granger, and Son of the Guardsman, followed by The Great Adventures of Captain Kidd in 1953. He also directed around two dozen western features, as well as episodes of the TV series The Adventures of Kit Carson, Hopalong Cassidy and The Cisco Kid.

Selected filmography
 Texas Rifles (1944)
 Northwest Trail (1945)
 Both Barrels Blazing (1945)
Rustlers of the Badlands (1945) 
Drifting Along  (1946)
 South of the Chisholm Trail (1947)
 Docks of New Orleans (1948)
 The Girl from San Lorenzo (1950)
 Whistling Hills (1951)

References

External links

1903 births
1974 deaths
American film directors